Sistersville City Hall, also known as the City Building, is a historic city hall located at Sistersville, Tyler County, West Virginia. It was built in 1897, and is a two-story red brick and stone building. The 16 sided unique building features centrally located, three-sided bay windows on each section. The building at one time housed the city jail.

It was listed on the National Register of Historic Places in 1972.

References

Buildings and structures in Tyler County, West Virginia
City halls in West Virginia
City and town halls on the National Register of Historic Places in West Virginia
Government buildings completed in 1897
National Register of Historic Places in Tyler County, West Virginia